Ponto dos Volantes is a Brazilian municipality located in the northeast of the state of Minas Gerais. The city belongs to the mesoregion of Jequitinhonha and to the microregion of Araçuaí. As of 2020 the population was 12,179 in an area of 1,215 km².  The elevation is 400 meters. It became a municipality in 1997. The postal code (CEP) is 39615-000.

This is one of the poorest municipalities in the state and in the country. The main economic activities are cattle raising (14,000 head in 2006) and farming with modest production of bananas, coffee, mangoes, guava, rice, sugarcane, and corn. In 2006 there were 976 rural producers on a total area of 47,734 hectares. Cropland made up 8,200 hectares. There were 18 tractors. In the urban area there were no financial institutions as of 2006. There were 167 automobiles, giving a ratio of about one automobile for every 65 inhabitants. Health care was provided by 5 public health clinics. There were no hospitals.

Municipal Human Development Index
MHDI: .594 (2000)
State ranking: 842 out of 853 municipalities as of 2000
National ranking: 4,771 out of 5,138 municipalities as of 2000
Life expectancy: 64
Literacy rate: 62 
Combined primary, secondary and tertiary gross enrolment ratio: .757
Per capita income (monthly): R$63.07 (For the complete list see Frigoletto)
Note that at last count Brazil had 5,561 municipalities while Minas Gerais still had 853.

The above figures can be compared with those of Poços de Caldas, which had an MHDI of .841, the highest in the state of Minas Gerais. The highest MHDI in the country (2000) was São Caetano do Sul in the state of São Paulo with an MHDI of .919.  More up-to-date data from 2004 show that the lowest in that year was Manari in the state of Pernambuco with an MHDI of .467 out of a total of 5504 municipalities in the country as of 2004. At last count Brazil had 5,561 municipalities so this might have changed at the time of this writing.

See also
List of municipalities in Minas Gerais

References

IBGE

Municipalities in Minas Gerais